The year 2021 started with varying degrees of legalization for unrestricted-THC content cannabis in 34 states, or over half of U.S. states, and continued federal prohibition except for low-THC hemp. Several states considered candidates for 2021 legislation to legalize cannabis for adult use included Connecticut, New Mexico, New York, Pennsylvania, Rhode Island, Texas, and Virginia, some of which like New York had already decriminalized. At the federal level, the Democratic Party's majority in both houses of the 117th United States Congress was cited by Politico as a likely precondition for federal legalization in 2021, with the SAFE Banking Act likely to pass.

Legislation and initiatives introduced in 2020 for 2021 sessions

Maryland legalization HB0032 was introduced by Jazz Lewis in December 2020 for the 2021 legislative session.
A Missouri legalization bill was pre-filed in December 2020 by Republican state legislator Shamed Dogan.
A "justice roadmap" published by New York state Republican lawmakers in late December 2020 included legalization.
Two Texas legalization bills were introduced in November 2020: SB 140 by Senator Roland Gutierrez, and HB 447 by Representative Joe Moody.

Legislation passed in 2020 pending governor's action in 2021
NJ A21 (20R), a legalization and regulation bill, and NJ A1897 (20R), decriminalization, were sent to the governor on December 17. New Jersey governor Phil Murphy said he would conditionally veto the bills if language on underage possession was not reconciled by January 30.

Legislation and initiatives introduced in 2021

State

Federal

Mass pardons
On February 18, 37 members of Congress – including two members of the Congressional Cannabis Caucus, Barbara Lee and Earl Blumenauer, who were the authors – formally asked President Biden to fulfill a campaign promise by issuing a mass presidential pardon to Americans convicted of nonviolent cannabis crimes.

On November 10, a group of senators led by Elizabeth Warren wrote a letter to President Biden requesting him to issue pardons for individuals convicted of nonviolent cannabis crimes, referencing his campaign promise to "zero out" such convictions.

References

Further reading
: "how public sentiment surrounding marijuana has shifted in the United States and where the law may be headed from here"

External links
Marijuana on the ballot at Ballotpedia

Cannabis reform proposals 2021
Cannabis reform 2021

2021 United States
Reform proposals 2021